Pierre Rémond de Sainte-Albine (29 May 1699 – 9 October 1778) was an 18th-century French historian and playwright.

He collaborated with L'Europe savante, the Gazette de France (1733–1749 and 1751) and the Mercure de France of which he was chief editor for a time.

Works 
1716: L'Amante difficile ou l'Amant constant, comedy in 5 acts and in prose, with Antoine Houdar de La Motte, presented at the Théâtre of the Hôtel de Bourgogne 17 October (impr. 1726, réimpr. 1729, 1732)
1747: Le Comédien, 2 parts, (réimpr. 1749 and 1825]following Molé's Mémoires
1749: La Convention téméraire, comedy in 1 act
1749: L'Amour au village
1759: Abrégé de l'Histoire de De Thou, with observations

Sources 
 Cardinal Georges Grente (dir.), Dictionnaire des lettres françaises. Le XVIIIe, nouvelle édition revue et mise à jour sous la direction de François Moureau, Paris, Fayard, 1995

Bibliography 
 Gloria Höckner: Der Gefühlsschauspieler – Eine Schauspieltheorie von Pierre Remond de Sainte-Albine. GRIN Verlag, München 2008, 
 Gotthold Ephraim Lessing: Auszug aus dem „Schauspieler“ des Herrn Rémond von Sainte Albine., In: Theatralische Bibliothek, 1. Stück, Berlin: Christian Friederich Voss, 1754.
 Pierre Rémond de Sainte-Albine: Le Comédien, in two volumes, Paris, 1747.
 Peter Heßelmann: Gereinigtes Theater? - Dramaturgie und Schaubühne im Spiegel deutschsprachiger Theaterperiodika des 18. Jahrhunderts (1750–1800), Frankfurt am Main: Vittorio Klostermann GmbH, 2002.

External links 
 His theatre plays and their presentation at CÉSAR

18th-century French dramatists and playwrights
18th-century French historians
Members of the Prussian Academy of Sciences
Writers from Paris
1699 births
1778 deaths